Murum is a village and Gram Panchayat in Baramati Taluka in Pune District of Maharashtra State, India. It belongs to Desh or Paschim Maharashtra region. It is located 78 km south of District headquarters Pune. 34 km from Baramati.

Murum Pin code is 412306 and postal head office is Someshwarnagar .

Hol ( 7 km ), Khandobachiwadi ( 8 km ), Korhale Kh. ( 8 km ), Gadadarwadi ( 9 km ), Chopadaj ( 9 km ) are the nearby Villages to Murum. Murum is surrounded by Baramati Taluka towards East, Khandala Taluka towards west, Purandar Taluka towards west, Koregaon Taluka towards South .

Phaltan, Baramati, Sasvad, Wai are the nearby cities to Murum.

History

Murum has Ancient History as one of the most beautiful and Ancient Temples of Lord Shiva, It Is Said That it has been constructed In age of Mahabharata and Renovated time to time, few of old books have the reference of this temple.
Most of the village people speak Marathi, Hindi and English Language. Murum people use Marathi language for communication.

Demographics
Total Population

Census data 2011

Near By Industry 
The main crop of Murum is sugarcane. Near by Murum has two Sugar Factories: 
 Shri Someshwar Sahakari Sakhar Karkhana Ltd.(SSSSKL) and 
 New Phaltan Sugar Works Ltd.Sakharwadi

Transport 
Most of the people prefer to use State Transport (Maharashtra Government) buses. Private vehicles, auto rickshaws can be used on rent basis. Traffic is quite chaotic, with no signals. Most of the people use two-wheeler or private  vehicles as a mode of transportation. There is no railway in Murum.

Education

Schools and Colleges in near Murum

 ZP Primary School, Murum
 ZP Primary School, Salobawasti
 ZP Primary School, Kadamwasti
 New English School, Murum
 New English School, Wanewadi
 Shri.Someshwar Shikshan Prasarak Mandals, Someshwar Engineering College, Someshwar Nagar
 MSK College, Someshwar Nagar

Economy 
Murum and surrounding areas mostly depend on agriculture as the main source of income. The land in the region is very well irrigated because of Nira Left Canal irrigation from Veer Dam. Nira rivers also provide direct irrigation water to farms.

Google Map

References

Cities and towns in Pune district
Villages in Pune district